The Granatspitze is the mountain giving its name to the Granatspitze Group in the High Tauern, the Alpine backbone of Austria. This, despite the fact that several peaks in this group are actually higher, for example the Stubacher Sonnblick which is less than a kilometre to the north and two metres higher. But, unlike, its oft-climbed neighbour, the Granatspitze is more rarely frequented due to the level of difficulty of the ascent. The steep summit block of this striking peak is made of granite.

Ascent 
The easiest ascent runs from  initially westwards towards the notch of the Granatscharte, turning south in front of it to continue along the East Ridge (Ostgrat) to the summit. This route takes about 3 hours and has a climbing grade of II-. Another option is offered by the North Ridge (Nordgrat) with its several pinnacles or rock towers (Grattürme), but this is more difficult, albeit still II-. The South Ridge is also an option, especially from the East Tyrolean side. This can be reached from the Karl Fürst Hut, an emergency shelter west of the Stubacher Sonnblick, crossing the Prägratkees glacier, which has several difficult crevasses at the notch of Untere Keeswinkelscharte (II-).

Sources and maps 
Geord Zlöbl: Die Dreitausender Osttirols im Nationalpark Hohe Tauern. Verlag Grafik Zloebl, Lienz-Tristach 2005, .
Alpine Club map sheet 39, 1:25.000, Granatspitzgruppe. Österreichischer Alpenverein, 2002, .

Mountains of the Alps
Mountains of Tyrol (state)
Mountains of Salzburg (state)
Alpine three-thousanders
Geography of East Tyrol
Granatspitze Group